FFP may refer to:

Science and technology
 Falsification, fabrication, plagiarism, three types of scientific misconduct
 Far-field pattern, of an antenna or other radiation source
 Filtering facepiece, a filtering half mask
 FFP standards (filtering facepiece), EU standards for protective respirator masks
 Free-floating planet, a rogue planet
 Fresh frozen plasma, a blood product

Organisations
 Family First Party, an Australian political party
 Feminists Fighting Pornography, an American political activist organization
 Fisher Flying Products, a Canadian aircraft manufacturer
 Food for the Poor, an American charity
 Freedom Front Plus, a South African political party
 Fund for Peace, an American research and educational organization
 Future Forward Party, a Thai political party
 Prima Charter (ICAO code), a defunct Polish airline

Programs
 Food for Peace, a program of the United States Agency for International Development
 Food for Progress Program, of the United States Department of Agriculture
 Fair Food Program, an agreement between the Florida Tomato Growers and the Coalition of Immokalee Workers
 Frequent-flyer program, a loyalty program

Other uses
 First Floor Power, a Swedish rock band
 UEFA Financial Fair Play Regulations